Born in the U.S.A. Live: London 2013 is a limited edition DVD of a live full album performance of Born in the U.S.A. by Bruce Springsteen & the E Street Band and was recorded at the Hard Rock Calling festival in London, England, at Queen Elizabeth Olympic Park on June 30, 2013. The DVD is available exclusively as part of a deluxe edition of Springsteen's 2014 album, High Hopes.

Track list
"Born in the U.S.A." 
"Cover Me" 
"Darlington County" 
"Working on the Highway" 
"Downbound Train" 
"I'm on Fire"
"No Surrender" 
"Bobby Jean" 
"I'm Goin' Down" 
"Glory Days" 
"Dancing in the Dark" 
"My Hometown"

"Shut Out the Light" plays over the end credits

Personnel
The E Street Band
Bruce Springsteen - lead vocals, lead guitar, rhythm guitar, acoustic guitar, harmonica
Roy Bittan - piano, synthesizer
Charles Giordano - organ, background vocals
Nils Lofgren - rhythm guitar, lead guitar, acoustic guitar, background vocals
Garry Tallent - bass guitar,  background vocals
Soozie Tyrell - violin, acoustic guitar, percussion, background vocals
Steven Van Zandt - rhythm guitar, lead guitar, mandolin, acoustic guitar, background vocals
Max Weinberg - drums

The E Street Horns
Jake Clemons - saxophone, percussion, background vocals
Barry Danielian - trumpet, percussion
Clark Gayton - trombone, tuba, percussion
Eddie Manion - saxophone, percussion
Curt Ramm - trumpet, percussion

The E Street Choir
Curtis King - background vocals, tambourine
Cindy Mizelle - background vocals, tambourine
Michelle Moore - background vocals, rapping on Rocky Ground
Everett Bradley - percussion, background vocals

Special guests:
Adelle Springsteen (Bruce's mother was brought out to dance with him during "Dancing in the Dark")
Pamela Springsteen (Bruce's sister was brought out to sing with him during "Dancing in the Dark")

References

2014 live albums
2014 video albums
Bruce Springsteen live albums
Bruce Springsteen video albums
Live video albums